Fili may refer to:
FILI – Finnish Literature Exchange
Fili, a member of the class of poets in Ireland
Fíli, a Dwarf from The Hobbit novel by J. R. R. Tolkien
Fili (Moscow), a former village near Moscow, now a district in the same city; see also Church of the Intercession at Fili
Fili (Metro), a subway station in Moscow
Fyli, a town in Greece